Thomas Stewart may refer to:

Politicians and nobility
Thomas A. Stewart (politician) (1849–1920), member of the Wisconsin State Assembly
Thomas E. Stewart (1824–1904), U.S. Representative from New York
Thomas Joseph Stewart (1848–1926), Canadian politician
Tom Stewart (politician) (1892–1972), Tennessee politician
Thomas Stewart, 2nd Earl of Angus (1331–1361), medieval Scottish magnate
Thomas Stewart, Master of Mar, son of Alexander Stewart, Earl of Mar, grandson of Alexander Stewart, Earl of Buchan, and great-grandson of Robert II of Scotland

Sportspeople
Thomas Stewart (Scottish footballer) (1926–1989), Scottish footballer
Thomas Stewart (Irish footballer) (born 1986), Northern Irish footballer
Tom Stewart (Australian footballer) (born 1993), Australian rules footballer for Geelong
Tom Stewart (Scottish footballer) ( 1890s), Scottish footballer for Partick Thistle, Motherwell, Newcastle United, also known as George Stewart 
Tommy Stewart (footballer, born 1881) (1881–1955), English footballer
Tommy Stewart (footballer, born 1935) (1935–2006), Northern Irish footballer
Tom Stewart (cyclist) (born 1990), British racing cyclist
Tom Stewart (rugby union) (born 2001), Irish rugby union player

Musicians
Thomas Stewart (bass-baritone) (1928–2006), American opera singer who specialized in Wagnerian roles
Tommy Stewart (born 1966), drummer
Tommy Stewart (trumpeter) (born 1939), American trumpeter, arranger, producer, composer and pianist

Others
Thomas Stewart (bishop of St Andrews), illegitimate son of King Robert II of Scotland, Bishop of St. Andrews
Thomas Stewart (Catholic bishop) (1925–1994), bishop of the Roman Catholic Diocese of Chunchon
Thomas Stewart (civil engineer) (1857–1942), Scottish hydraulic engineer, designer of Woodhead Dam
Thomas A. Stewart (born c. 1948), editor and managing director of Harvard Business Review
Thomas McCants Stewart (1853–1923), African American clergyman, lawyer and civil rights leader
Thomas Dale Stewart (1890–1958), American chemist
Thomas Dale Stewart (anthropologist) (1901–1997), American forensic anthropologist
Thomas Somerville Stewart (1806–1889), Philadelphia architect, engineer and real estate developer
Tom Stewart (actor), English actor

See also
Sir Thomas Grainger Stewart (1837–1900), Scottish physician
Thomas Stuart (disambiguation)